Mohamed Khaled Belabbas (born 4 July 1981 in L'Haÿ-les-Roses, France) is an Algerian runner. He competed in the 3000 m steeplechase event at the 2012 Summer Olympics.

References

People from L'Haÿ-les-Roses
Algerian male steeplechase runners
French male steeplechase runners
1981 births
Living people
Olympic athletes of Algeria
Athletes (track and field) at the 2012 Summer Olympics
French sportspeople of Algerian descent
Sportspeople from Val-de-Marne